The men's tournament in volleyball at the 1996 Summer Olympics was the 9th edition of the event at the Summer Olympics, organized by the world's governing body, the FIVB in conjunction with the IOC. It was held in Atlanta and Athens, Georgia, United States from 21 July to 4 August 1996.

Qualification

Pools composition

Rosters

Venues

Preliminary round
The top four teams in each pool qualified for the quarterfinals.

Pool A

|}

|}

Pool B

|}

|}

Final round

Quarterfinals

|}

5th–8th semifinals

|}

Semifinals

|}

7th place match

|}

5th place match

|}

Bronze medal match

|}

Gold medal match

|}

Final standing

Medalists

Awards
Most Valuable Player
 Bas van de Goor
Best Spiker
 Bas van de Goor
Best Server
 Marcos Milinkovic
Best Blocker
 Nikolay Jeliazkov

References

External links
Final Standing (1964–2000)
Results at Todor66.com
Results at Sports123.com

Men's tournament
Men's events at the 1996 Summer Olympics